The men's ne-waza 85 kg competition in ju-jitsu at the 2017 World Games took place on 28 July 2017 at the GEM Sports Complex in Wrocław, Poland.

Results

Elimination round

Group A

Group B

Finals
{{#invoke:RoundN|N4
|widescore=yes|bold_winner=high|team-width=260
|RD1=Semifinals
|3rdplace=yes

||{{flagIOC2athlete|Daniel de Maddalena|SUI|2017 World Games}}|4||2
|||0|{{flagIOC2athlete|Dan Schon|MEX|2017 World Games}}|0

|||0|{{flagIOC2athlete|Dan Schon|MEX|2017 World Games}}|2

|||0|

References

Ju-jitsu at the 2017 World Games